Phase 4, Phase IV or Phase Four may refer to:

Media 
 Marvel Cinematic Universe: Phase Four, a group of superhero films and television series from 2021–2022
 Phase IV (1974 film), a 1974 film
 Phase IV (2002 film), a 2002 film
 Phase IV (album), a 1982 album by Art Zoyd
 Phase-4, a character in Dead or Alive 5 Ultimate

Other 
 Phase IV clinical trial, the fourth of the phases of clinical research
 Phase 4 Films, a Canadian film distribution company
 Phase 4 Stereo, record label and recording process
 Four-Phase Systems, a computer company
 Four-phase logic, is a type of, and design methodology for dynamic logic